Bolognetti is an Italian surname. Notable people with the surname include:

Alberto Bolognetti (1538–1585), Italian law professor, Roman Catholic bishop, diplomat, and cardinal
Giorgio Bolognetti (1595–1680), Italian Roman Catholic bishop

Italian-language surnames